Hastings Castle is a keep and bailey castle ruin situated in the town of Hastings, East Sussex. It overlooks the English Channel, into which large parts of the castle have fallen over the years.

History
Immediately after landing in England in 1066, William of Normandy ordered three fortifications to be built, Pevensey Castle in September 1066 (re-using the Roman Saxon Shore fort of Anderitum), Hastings (prior to the Battle of Hastings) and Dover. Hastings Castle was originally built as a motte-and-bailey castle near the sea. Later that year, the famous Battle of Hastings took place some miles to the north of Hastings Castle, in which William was victorious. In 1070, William issued orders for the castle to be rebuilt in stone, along with the St Mary's Chapel.

The Counts of Eu held the castle for most of the Norman period, beginning with Robert. In 1216, King John gave orders to destroy (slight) the castles at Hastings and Pevensey, while he retreated from a French army led by Dauphin Louis that had landed in Kent. In 1220, Henry III re-fortified the castle.

In time however the house of Eu forfeited control of Hastings Castle, when the family heir William made the decision to keep his French assets over the English ones, and was denied the right to his inheritance. In 1242, Henry III bestowed rule of the castle and its lands to his wife's uncle, Peter of Savoy, who then governed the estate until passing away.

In February 1287, violent storms hit the south coast of England with such force that the soft sandstone cliffs eventually succumbed to the elements. Large sections of the face fell into the sea along with parts of the castle.

In both 1339 and 1377, the town was attacked by the French leaving many burnt buildings which included homes. Throughout the next century erosion was unchecked and gradually more of the castle was lost to the sea.

The site was purchased by Thomas Pelham on 23 June 1591. After the purchase, the site was purchased by the Pelham family and used for farming until the ruins had become so overgrown they were lost from memory.

In 1824, the then owner the Earl of Chichester commissioned some archaeological investigations of the ruin. As a result of these, the chapel floor and parts of the chancel arch and walls were re-constructed out of blocks found lying on the ground.

During World War II, the castle received more damage as Hastings was a target for bombing raids. In 1951, the Hastings Corporation purchased the site and converted it into a tourist attraction.

The castle is open to the public between March and October.

References

Fry, Plantagenet Somerset, The David & Charles Book of Castles, David & Charles, 1980.

External links

Buildings and structures in Hastings
History of East Sussex
Castles in East Sussex
Ruins in East Sussex
Grade I listed buildings in East Sussex